Big Brother Naija, formerly known as Big Brother Nigeria, is a Nigerian reality competition television series, based on the Big Brother television franchise, in which, contestants live in an isolated house and compete for a large cash prize and other material prizes, at the end of the show by avoiding being evicted from the house by viewers who vote for their favourite housemates to remain in the show.

The first season of the show first aired on M-Net and DStv Channel 37 from 5 March to 4 June 2006. The voting results were verified by the auditing company of Alexander-Forbes.

Series overview

Season 1

The first season of the show first aired on DStv Channel 37 from 5 March to 4 June 2006. In a twist to the game, two new contestants were introduced on Day 23, much to the excitement of the remaining housemates.

Ebuka, the most popular housemate for several weeks into the show and widely believed to emerge the winner was the seventh housemate to be evicted; many viewers blame the Joe's Fan Club (JFC) for his eviction. Joe himself was soon evicted from the show.

Big Brother added another twist to the game on Day 79 by cancelling the day's scheduled nominations and making the housemates believe they will instead be evicted based on their performances on assigned tasks, while in reality, no more evictions were held and viewers began voting for the winner who turned out to be 26-year-old Katung Aduwak.

Housemates

Nominations table 

All You Need To Know About BBN S7==References==

External links 
Big Brother Nigeria

Big Brother Naija Season 7 News

2006 Nigerian television seasons
Nigeria
Nigerian reality television series
2006 Nigerian television series debuts
2006 Nigerian television series endings
M-Net original programming